Ras-related protein Rab-33B is a protein that in humans is encoded by the RAB33B gene.

Mutations in this gene have been associated to cases of Dyggve-Melchior-Clausen syndrome.

References

Further reading